Uwe B. Sleytr (born July 15, 1942 in Vienna, Austria) is an emeritus professor of microbiology and the former head of the Department of Nanobiotechnology at the University of Natural Resources and Life Sciences, Vienna. He is a full member of the Division of Mathematics and Natural Sciences of the Austrian Academy of Sciences and has published approximately 420 scientific papers, 5 books and several patents.

Biography 

Sleytr studied Food and Biotechnology at the University of Natural Resources and Life Sciences, Vienna, graduating with a PhD (Dr. nat. Techn.) in 1970. He subsequently was Senior Research Scientist at the Medical Research Council Laboratory of Molecular Biology and the Strangeways Research Laboratory in Cambridge with a fellowship from the Medical Research Council. In 1973 he received his habilitation in General Microbiology from the University of Natural Resources and Life Sciences, Vienna. He also served as visiting Professor at Temple University in 1977-78. In 1980 he was appointed head of the Department of Nano-Biotechnology at the University of Natural Resources and Life Sciences, Vienna in 1980. He served in this role until 2010 when he became professor emeritus.

Sleytr has been bestowed honorary professorships by the Shanghai Jiaotong University, Sichuan University and the China University of Petroleum.

Research 

Sleytr is an early researcher and pioneer in the field of Nanobiotechnology. He first discovered the S-layered Protein which has found important applications in nano-biotechnology. Sleytr's work has contributed significantly to the fact that today it is recognized that most bacteria and almost all archaea form S-layers as cell surface structure.

Together with his Karin Thorne, he was able to prove that S-layers can also consist of glycoproteins, which was the first evidence for the glycosylation of a cell wall protein in bacteria. His investigations of the dynamic self-organization of S-layers on growing and dividing cells and the assembly of isolated S-layer monomers in vitro have shown that S-layers are the simplest isopore protein membranes developed during evolution. These results were also the basis for the production of large S-layer ultrafiltration membranes with strictly defined separation (cut off) limits.

Major fields of application were derived from the fact that S-layer proteins could be fused with other functional proteins (e.g. ligands, antigens, antibodies, enzymes, peptides) and assembled on solid carriers (e.g. metals, semiconductors, graphene, polymers) and lipid membranes including liposomes and emulsomes in the form of regular lattices. Due to their unique repetitive physicochemical properties, S-layers could be used in combination with other biomolecules (proteins, lipids, carbohydrates, nucleic acids, etc.) and nanoparticles as patterning elements and basic building blocks for the production of sometimes very complex supramolecular structures. This also opened up a wide range of applications for S-layers in synthetic biology, biomimetics and nanotechnology.

Selected awards and fellowships  

 Member of the European Academy of Sciences and Arts (2008) 
 Wilhelm Exner Medal (1998)
 Science Award of the City of Vienna (1998)
 Philip Morris Research Award (1998) (with M. Sara)
 Member of the Austrian Academy of Sciences (1994) 
 Innitzer Award(1989) 
 EUREKA Award (1988) 
 Sandoz-Novartis Award (1971) 
 Schwackhöfer-Award (1970)

Selected publications 

 Sleytr, U.B. 1978. Regular arrays of macromolecules on bacterial cell walls: structure, chemistry, assembly and function. Int. Rev. Cytol. 53: 1-64.
 Sleytr, U.B., B. Schuster, E.-M. Egelseer, D. Pum. S-layers: principles and applications. FEMS Microbiol. Rev. 38 (2014) 823–864.
 Pum, D., U.B. Sleytr. 2014. Reassembly of S-layer proteins. Nanotechnology 25:312001. DOI: 10.1088/0957-4484/25/31/312001.
 Ücisik, M.H., U.B. Sleytr, B. Schuster. 2015. Emulsomes meet S-layer proteins: An emerging targeted drug delivery system. Curr. Pharm. Biotechnol. 16:392-405. DOI: 10.2174/138920101604150218112656.
 U.B. Sleytr,  A.W. Robards. Freeze-fracturing: a review of methods and results. J. Microsc. 111 (1977) 77-100.
 U.B. Sleytr,   A.W. Robards. Plastic deformation during freeze-cleavage:a review. J. Microsc. 110 (1977) 1-25.
 Ilk, N., E.M. Egelseer, U.B. Sleytr. S-layer fusion proteins - construction principles and applications. Curr. Opin. Biotech. 22(6) (2011) 824–831.
 Schuster, B., U.B. Sleytr. Biomimetic interfaces  S-layer proteins, lipid membranes and membrane proteins. J. R. Soc. Interface 11 (2014) 20140232.

References

External links 
 Homepage: Art and Science

1942 births
Living people
Austrian biologists